National Tertiary Route 321, or just Route 321 (or ) is a National Road Route of Costa Rica, located in the San José province.

Description
In San José province the route covers Pérez Zeledón canton (El General, Daniel Flores districts).

References

Highways in Costa Rica